Johannes Reesen (1 February 1900 Puiatu Parish (now Viljandi Parish), Kreis Fellin – 11 November 1937, Leningrad) was an Estonian politician. He was a member of I Riigikogu. He was a member of the Riigikogu since 29 September 1922. He replaced Johannes Vanja.

References

1900 births
1937 deaths
People from Viljandi Parish
People from Kreis Fellin
Russian Social Democratic Labour Party members
Bolsheviks
Central Committee of Tallinn Trade Unions politicians
Workers' United Front politicians
Members of the Central Committee of the Communist Party of Estonia
Members of the Riigikogu, 1920–1923
Members of the Riigikogu, 1923–1926
Estonian emigrants to the Soviet Union
Great Purge victims from Estonia